A moss frog belongs to either of two neobatrachian lineages, both found in sub-Saharan Africa and one also in Asia:

 Arthroleptella, a genus of true frogs from southern Africa
 Rhacophoridae, a family of the Old World Tropics

Animal common name disambiguation pages